Lissachatina  is a genus of air-breathing tropical land snails, terrestrial pulmonate gastropod mollusks in the subfamily Achatininae of the  family Achatinidae.

The molecular data clearly shows that Lissachatina consistently clusters as a monophyletic entity separate from Achatina and Fontanilla stated that there is no basis for continuing to employ Lissachatina as a subgenus of Achatina and that it should be regarded as a genus in its own right.

Species
 Lissachatina albopicta (E. A. Smith, 1878)
 Lissachatina allisa (L. Reeve, 1849)
 Lissachatina bloyeti (Bourguignat, 1890)
 Lissachatina capelloi (Furtado, 1886)
 Lissachatina eleanorae (Mead, 1995)
 Lissachatina fulica (Bowdich, 1822)
 Lissachatina glaucina (E. A. Smith, 1899)
 Lissachatina glutinosa (L. Pfeiffer, 1854)
 Lissachatina immaculata (Lamarck, 1822)
 Lissachatina johnstoni (E. A. Smith, 1899)
 Lissachatina kilimae (Dautzenberg, 1908)
 Lissachatina lactea (L. Reeve, 1842)
 Lissachatina loveridgei (Clench & Archer, 1930)
 Lissachatina reticulata (L. Pfeiffer, 1845)
 Lissachatina zanzibarica (Bourguignat, 1879)
Species brought into synonymy
 Lissachatina yalaensis (Germain, 1936): synonym of Oreohomorus connollyi (Odhner, 1932)

References

External links

 Bequaert, J. C. (1950). Studies in the Achatininae, a group of African land snails. Bulletin of the Museum of Comparative Zoology. 105(1): 1-216, plates 1-81
 Clench, W. J.; Archer, A. F. (1930). New land snails from Tanganyika territory. Occasional Papers of the Boston Society of Natural History. 5: 295-300

Achatinidae